Passiflora palenquensis is a flowering member of the family Passifloraceae. It is very closely related to Passiflora seemannii, which has 2 other close related species. Passiflora palenquensis is restricted to low elevations, usually growing around bases of mountains. P. palenquensis is also related to Passiflora montana, which is another of the 4 relatively new species originating in Ecuador.

References
P. palenquensis at Botanicus.org

Flora of Ecuador
palenquensis